Rhymes & Reasons is the fourth album by American singer-songwriter Carole King. Released in 1972, the album features a single "Been to Canaan", which topped the Billboard Adult Contemporary chart and peaked at number 24 on the Pop chart. The album itself also became a hit, reaching number two on the Billboard 200 chart.

Track listing
All songs by Carole King unless otherwise noted.
Side one
"Come Down Easy" (Carole King, Toni Stern) - 3:06
"My My She Cries" (Carole King, Toni Stern) - 2:19
"Peace in the Valley" (Carole King, Toni Stern) - 3:23
"Feeling Sad Tonight" (Carole King, Toni Stern) - 3:13
"The First Day in August" (Carole King, Charles Larkey) - 2:50
"Bitter with the Sweet" – 2:29
Side two
"Goodbye Don't Mean I'm Gone" – 3:34
"Stand Behind Me" – 2:29
"Gotta Get Through Another Day" – 2:35
"I Think I Can Hear You" – 3:26
"Ferguson Road" (Gerry Goffin, Carole King) - 2:40
"Been to Canaan" – 3:38

Personnel
Carole King – vocals, piano, clavinet, Wurlitzer, Fender Rhodes 
Charles Larkey – bass guitar, double bass 
Harvey Mason – drums, vibraslap
Ms. Bobbye Hall – tambourine, shaker, bells, congas, bongos
Daniel Kortchmar – electric guitar
David T. Walker – electric guitar
Red Rhodes – steel guitar
Harry "Sweets" Edison – flugelhorn, trumpet
Robert "Bobby" Bryant – flugelhorn, trumpet
George Bohanon – trombone
Ernie Watts – flute
String Section:
Conducted and arranged by David Campbell and Norman Kurban
David Campbell and Carole Mukogawa – viola
Terry King and Nathaniel Rosen – cellos
Charles Larkey – string bass
Barry Socher, Eliot Chapo, Marcy Dicterow, Gordon Marron, Sheldon Sanov and Polly Sweeney – violin

Additional credits
Hank Cicaloengineer
Steve Mitchellassistant engineer
Chuck Beesongraphic concept and design
Jim McCraryphotography

Charts

Weekly charts

Year-end charts

Certifications

References

1972 albums
Carole King albums
Albums arranged by David Campbell (composer)
Albums produced by Lou Adler
A&M Records albums
Ode Records albums
Albums recorded at A&M Studios